Mănăstioara may refer to several villages in Romania:

 Mănăstioara, a village in Uliești Commune, Dâmbovița County
 Mănăstioara, a village in the town of Siret, Suceava County
 Mănăstioara, a village in Udești Commune, Suceava County
 Mănăstioara, a village in Fitionești Commune, Vrancea County